Christopher McNealy (born July 15, 1961) is an American former professional basketball player. He played in the National Basketball Association for the New York Knicks between 1985 and 1988. He also played internationally in Italy and Spain. McNealy later acquired Italian citizenship.

McNealy’s son, also named Chris, played college basketball for UC Irvine and plays professionally.

References

1961 births
Living people
African-American basketball players
Albany Patroons players
American expatriate basketball people in Italy
American expatriate basketball people in Spain
American men's basketball players
Baloncesto León players
Basketball players from California
Bay State Bombardiers players
BC Andorra players
Expatriate basketball people in Andorra
American expatriate basketball people in Andorra
CB Granada players
Fortitudo Pallacanestro Bologna players
Kansas City Kings draft picks
La Crosse Catbirds players
Liga ACB players
Naturalised citizens of Italy
New York Knicks players
Power forwards (basketball)
Real Betis Baloncesto players
San Jose State Spartans men's basketball players
Santa Barbara City Vaqueros men's basketball players
Sportspeople from Fresno, California
21st-century African-American people
20th-century African-American sportspeople